Luděk Pernica (born 16 June 1990 in Boskovice) is a Czech football player who currently plays for Viktoria Plzeň in the Czech First League.

He scored for FK Jablonec against Slavia Prague in the 2017–18 Czech Cup final but Prague won 3–1 on 9 May 2018.

References

External links
 
 
 Profile at FC Zbrojovka Brno official site

1990 births
Living people
Czech footballers
Czech First League players
FC Zbrojovka Brno players
People from Boskovice
FK Jablonec players
Association football central defenders
FC Viktoria Plzeň players
Czech Republic youth international footballers
Sportspeople from the South Moravian Region